The three-day May 1921 geomagnetic storm, also known as the New York Railroad Storm, was caused by the impact of an extraordinarily powerful coronal mass ejection on Earth's magnetosphere. It occurred on 13–15 May as part of solar cycle 15, and was the most intense geomagnetic storm of the 20th century.

Since it occurred before the extensive interconnectivity of electrical systems and the general electrical dependence of infrastructure in the developed world, its effect was restricted; however, its ground currents were up to an order of magnitude greater than those of the March 1989 geomagnetic storm which interrupted electrical service to large parts of northeastern North America.

Effects
The storm's electrical current sparked a number of fires worldwide, including one near Grand Central Terminal which made it known as the "New York Railroad Storm".

The storm was extensively reported in New York City, which was a center of telegraph activity as a railroad hub. Auroras ("northern lights") appeared throughout the eastern United States, creating brightly-lit night skies. Telegraph service in the U.S. first slowed and then virtually stopped at about midnight on 14 May due to blown fuses and damaged equipment. Radio propagation was enhanced during the storm due to ionosphere involvement, however, enabling unusually good long-distance reception. Electric lights were not noticeably affected. 

Undersea telegraph cables were affected by the storm. Damage to telegraph systems was also reported in Europe and the Southern Hemisphere.

2021 study estimated Dstm of -533 nT.

See also
 Active region
 Geomagnetic storm
 List of solar storms

References

Footnotes

Bibliography
The Aurora Borealis of May 14, 1921 
  A bibliography of newspaper and journal articles.

External links 
 
 

1921 in science
1921 natural disasters
Geomagnetic storms
1921 natural disasters in the United States
May 1921 events